Whitcombe is a surname of Old English origin.

Notables with this name include
Charles Douglas Whitcombe (1835–1902), New Zealand civil servant
Dave Whitcombe, an English professional darts player
Frederic Whitcombe, a member of the Western Australian Legislative Council (1898-1900)
Frank Whitcombe, a Welsh Rugby player
Frank Whitcombe Jr an English Rugby player
George Whitcombe a Welsh Football & Baseball player
Jonathan Whitcombe, an English professional wrestler
Martin Whitcombe an English Rugby player
Philip Arthur Whitcombe (1923-2015), first class English cricketer
Reg Whitcombe (1898-1957), an English golfer
Robert Whitcombe (1862-1922), an eminent Anglican bishop
Thomas Whitcombe (c.1763–c.1824), an English maritime artist.

Whitcomb
Arthur J. Whitcomb, an American lawyer and politician
Christopher Whitcomb, an American author and former member of the FBI's Hostage Rescue Team
Edgar D. Whitcomb, the 43rd Governor of Indiana (1969-1973)
Ian Whitcomb, an entertainer, songwriter, author, record producer and actor
James Whitcomb, a governor of Indiana (1843-1848)
John C. Whitcomb, an American Old Testament theologian
Jon Whitcomb, an American illustrator
Orlan P. Whitcomb, An American politician
Richard T. Whitcomb, an aeronautical engineer
Robert Whitcomb, an American journalist
R. Steven Whitcomb, a lieutenant general of the US Army
Sami Whitcomb, American-Australian basketball player
Stanley E. Whitcomb (born 1951), American physicist

Given Name
 Whitcomb L. Judson, an American inventor
 James Whitcomb Riley, an American writer and poet

Places
 Whitcombe and Tombs, a book publisher, stationery manufacturer, and retail bookseller in New Zealand

References